The 2000 Calabrian regional election took place on 16 April 2000.

Giuseppe Chiaravalloti (Forza Italia) was narrowly elected President of the Region.

Results

Source: Ministry of the Interior

References

Elections in Calabria
2000 elections in Italy